Bama Yao Autonomous County (Zhuang: ,) is a county in Guangxi, China. It is under the administration of Hechi City. The residents of Bama County have a reputation for longevity, and Bama has been the focus of studies from geriatricians nationwide.

History 
In 1929, Bama County was part of a short-lived soviet led by Deng Xiaoping.

The county is famous for its large number of centenarians. Longevity in Bama County has been associated with cleanliness of the air and water, simplicity of life, and the lack of meat in the typical diet. 

Bama County, like the province it is a part of, is a historically poor county. It is now becoming a major destination for health tourism within China, resulting in increasing economic opportunities.

Administrative divisions
There is 1 town and 9 townships in the county:

The only town is Bama.

Townships:
Yandong Township, Jiazhuan Township, Nashe Township, Suolue Township, Xishan Township, Dongshan Township, Fenghuang Township, Bailin Township, Natao Township

Demographics
The Yao people of Bama County consist of the following three subgroups.

Bunu: in Dongshan
Nuomang: in Suolüe and Yandong
Nuonuo: in remaining townships

Climate

References

External links

 
County-level divisions of Guangxi
Administrative divisions of Hechi
Yao autonomous counties